Jessica Landaw is an American director, editor and producer of film and television.

She has directed a number of documentaries and short films in career as well as working as an editor on the films Mighty Morphin Power Rangers: The Movie (1995), The Great White Hype (1996), The War at Home (1996) and The House of Yes (1997).

As a television director her credits are Judging Amy, Cold Case, Bones, One Tree Hill and web series The Booth at the End starring Xander Berkeley.

References

External links

American documentary filmmakers
American film editors
American film directors
American film producers
American television directors
American television producers
American women television producers
American women television directors
Living people
Place of birth missing (living people)
Year of birth missing (living people)
American women film editors
American women documentary filmmakers
21st-century American women